Baava Baamaida is a 2001 Indian Kannada-language romantic comedy film starring Shiva Rajkumar and Rambha. The film is directed by Kishore Sarja and based on the Tamil language film Pandithurai (1992) directed by Manoj Kumar.

In an interview to Kannada newspaper Vijaya Karnataka, Shiva Rajkumar had revealed that Chiranjeevi Sarja had worked as an assistant director to his uncle, director Kishore Sarja, on the sets of this movie.

Cast

 Shiva Rajkumar
 Rambha
 Prakash Rai
 Vinaya Prasad
 Rani
 Jayanthi
 Loknath
 Sadhu Kokila
 Doddanna
 Karibasavaiah

Soundtrack
All the songs are composed and scored by Hamsalekha.

References

External links 
 

2001 films
2000s Kannada-language films
Kannada remakes of Tamil films
Indian romantic comedy-drama films
Films scored by Hamsalekha
2001 romantic comedy films
Films directed by Kishore Sarja